Lewis Machine and Tool Company (LMT) is an American armaments company founded by Karl Lewis, in 1980. LMT manufactures weapon systems including the M4 carbine and the M203 grenade launcher. LMT products are used by the military forces of the United Kingdom, New Zealand, Estonia, and the United States.

Products

Bolt and bolt carrier groups 
Lewis Machine and Tool Company produces a patented AR-15-pattern bolt design featuring a redesigned extractor intended to improve the extraction of cartridges under adverse conditions. The company also produces a redesigned bolt carrier intended to improve the performance of the rifle's direct-impingement gas operation.

LM308MWS and CQB MRP Defender 
Lewis Machine and Tool Company created the Monolithic Rail Platform (MRP), a one-piece, Picatinny-topped AR-15-pattern upper receiver made from a forged aluminum block. The MRP upper receiver has a quick-change barrel system. Its top rail position matches M4 and E3-type weapons for optical and sight compatibility.

In late 2009, LMT introduced the .308 Modular Weapon System LM308MWS, which uses the 7.62×51mm NATO round.

In February 2012, the British Transport Police began to use AR-pattern short-barreled rifles produced by LMT.

L129A1

In 2009, Lewis Machine & Tool Co was contracted to supply the British Ministry of Defence (MOD) with 440 LM308MWS 7.62×51mm rifles under the official service designation as the L129A1. Its NATO Stock Number (NSN) is 1005-99-226-6708. As of December 2014, over 3,000 units have been supplied to UK forces.

The LM308MWS was submitted for the British Ministry of Defence's Urgent Operational Requirement (UOR) for immediate deployment of a semiautomatic 7.62 NATO caliber sharpshooter rifle in Afghanistan. Other rifles submitted included the FN Herstal SCAR-H, Heckler & Koch HK417 and Sabre Defence XR-10. LMT's rifle was chosen, earning it the L129A1 designation and entered service April 2010 in Afghanistan. The standard optic for the L129A1 is the TA648-308 6×48 Trijicon ACOG. It can fire standard 7.62 mm ball ammunition, but the official issue rounds are 155-grain L42A1-A3 sniper and L59A1 "High Performance" ball ammunition. The ACOG is mounted to a Picatinny rail to which is fitted a Trijicon RM01 1 x Ruggedized Miniature Reflex (RMR) for Close Quarters Battle use. 

The LM308MWS standard US commercial model differs slightly from the UK issued L129A1 in barrel length and twist rate. Its muzzle device is a standard M16A2 flash suppressor. It uses detachable fixed sights instead of folding sights. Its furniture is black instead of brown. Finally, the designation on the receiver is "LM308MWS" instead of "L129A1."

There are also UK commercial variants of the L129A1 and the CQB MRP Defender. Designated the LMT308SP and CQB 5.56SP, the models are a straight pull action rifle, and not semi-automatic due to UK laws.

The New Zealand Army adopted the rifle in October 2011. It differs from its UK counterpart in the use of a Leupold adjustable 4.5-14× scope, canted iron sights and a foldable foregrip.

MARS-L

New Zealand 
On 12 August 2015, the New Zealand Ministry of Defence announced that it would be replacing the current Steyr AUG rifle for the three branches of the New Zealand Defence Force with a rifle from LMT, one of eight companies that had submitted rifles for trials between March and June 2015. Like the Steyr AUG, the submitted LMT design was also chambered in 5.56×45mm NATO. A contract of NZD $59 million was awarded to LMT for 9,040 rifles, designated the MARS-L (Modular Ambidextrous Rifle System-Light).

The rifles were delivered in May 2017, and soldiers began training with them at Waiouru Military Camp on 15 June 2017.

In September 2018, it was reported that some of the rifles had experienced breakages, including 130 with cracks around the bolt, and that all 9,040 rifles had had their firing pins replaced under warranty. LMT later claimed that the number of worn or broken firing pins was actually much smaller, in the range of "less than one tenth of one percent". The issue reportedly stemmed from improper tempering. While replacing the firing pins, a similar quantity of selector switches and bolt carriers had also been found to display premature wear and were replaced.

Estonia 

In May 2019, the Estonian Defence Forces selected the MARS-L after two years of testing to replace their IMI Galil and Ak 4 rifles. 19,000 MARS-L rifles were ordered under the designation R-20 Rahe ("Hail" in Estonian).
The upper receiver has a Picatinny rail on the top and M-LOK compatible attachment points on its sides and uses a short-stroke gas piston system. The standard barrel length of the R-20 is 14.3", but a 12.5" variant designated the R-20 S is also produced. A modified trigger design allows the trigger safety to be engaged without the hammer being cocked, which is not possible on a standard AR-15 pattern rifle.

In June 2020, the first batch of 1,500 R-20 Rahe rifles was delivered. The R-20 is planned to fully replace the Galil and Ak 4 by 2022.

Estonia also acquired a designated marksman rifle variant of the MARS chambered in 7.62×51mm NATO with a 16" barrel. The official Estonian designation for the marksman rifle is the R-20 L.

References

External links

Firearm manufacturers of the United States
Manufacturing companies based in Illinois
Milan, Illinois
Quad Cities
Companies based in Rock Island County, Illinois
Companies based in the Quad Cities
Designated marksman rifles